The zhuihu (坠胡, pinyin: zhùihú; also called zhuiqin or zhuizixian) is a two-stringed bowed string instrument from China. In construction, it resembles the sanxian, and likely evolved as a bowed version of that musical instrument. Unlike bowed string instruments in the huqin family (such as the erhu), the zhuihu has a fretless fingerboard against which the strings are pressed while playing.

The zhuihu is used to accompany a form of traditional narrative singing referred to as zhuizi, which originated in the Henan province of China. A more modern version of the zhuihu called the leiqin was developed in China in the 20th century. Another related instrument is the Japanese kokyū.

References

External links
Zhuihu page from Paul and Bernice Noll site
Photo of zhuihu from Paul and Bernice Noll site
Zhuihu page
Article about zhuizi
Zhuihu photo

Video
Zhuihu video

Chinese musical instruments
Bowed string instruments